Pancras may refer to:

 Saint Pancras of Taormina
 Saint Pancras of Rome, saint martyred c.304 AD
 St Pancras (disambiguation)

See also
 Pancrase, a hybrid wrestling (MMA) organization.
 Pankrac